Carl Saunte (31 October 1872 – 27 February 1955) was a Danish equestrian. He competed in three events at the 1912 Summer Olympics.

References

External links
 

1872 births
1955 deaths
Danish male equestrians
Olympic equestrians of Denmark
Equestrians at the 1912 Summer Olympics